Andrzej Prawda (10 July 1951 – 13 November 2020) was a Polish football manager.

On November 13, 2020, Prawda's friend Jerzy Engel announced that he had died from COVID-19 during the COVID-19 pandemic in Poland.

References

1951 births
2020 deaths
Sportspeople from Gdańsk
Kujawiak Włocławek players
Polish football managers
Świt Nowy Dwór Mazowiecki managers
Odra Opole managers
Znicz Pruszków managers
Deaths from the COVID-19 pandemic in Poland
Polish footballers
Association footballers not categorized by position